Angela Farrell (born 20 September 1981) is an Australian sailor who represented Australia at the 2008 Beijing Olympics. 

Farrell competed in the three-person keelboat (Yngling) event with skipper Krystal Weir and fellow crew Karyn Gojnich. Their best performance was a win in the first race and they finished tenth overall.

References 

Living people
1981 births
Sailors at the 2008 Summer Olympics – Yngling
Olympic sailors of Australia
Australian female sailors (sport)
21st-century Australian women